Maximiliano Lélis Rodrigues (born 7 February 1987), known as just Max, is a Brazilian footballer. He currently plays for Ferroviária.

Honours

Remo
Campeonato Paraense: 2014, 2015

External links

1987 births
Living people
Brazilian footballers
Clube Atlético Mineiro players
Clube do Remo players
Ipatinga Futebol Clube players
São Bernardo Futebol Clube players
ABC Futebol Clube players
Guarani FC players
Joinville Esporte Clube players
Associação Desportiva São Caetano players
Sport Club do Recife players
Associação Ferroviária de Esportes players
Campeonato Brasileiro Série B players
Campeonato Brasileiro Série C players
Campeonato Brasileiro Série D players
Association football defenders